Sharyn Minahan was an Australian ambassador having served as Ambassador to Denmark (non-resident to Norway and Iceland) from 2006 until 2010 and Argentina, Uruguay and Paraguay.

References

Australian women ambassadors
Ambassadors of Australia to Denmark
Ambassadors of Australia to Norway
Ambassadors of Australia to Iceland
Ambassadors of Australia to Argentina
Ambassadors of Australia to Paraguay
Ambassadors of Australia to Uruguay